Henri Junghänel (also spelled Junghaenel, born 5 February 1988) is a German shooter. He represented his country at the 2016 Summer Olympics, where he won the gold medal in the 50 metre rifle prone event.

Olympic results

References

External links 
 
 
 
 
 

1988 births
Living people
German male sport shooters
Shooters at the 2016 Summer Olympics
Olympic shooters of Germany
Olympic gold medalists for Germany
Olympic medalists in shooting
Medalists at the 2016 Summer Olympics
Shooters at the 2015 European Games
European Games medalists in shooting
European Games gold medalists for Germany
21st-century German people
20th-century German people